Eduard Mnatsakanian (December 6, 1938 – January 18, 2016) was an Armenian chess International Master (1978). He was Armenian champion in 1958, 1959, 1960, 1962, and 1967.

Achievements
1979: Third at Starý Smokovec
1986: Third at Varna

References

External links

Eduard Mnatsakanian chess games - 365Chess.com

1938 births
2016 deaths
Sportspeople from Yerevan
Armenian chess players
Chess International Masters